Kovin is a town and municipality located in the South Banat District of the autonomous province of Vojvodina, Serbia. The town has a population of 13,515, while the municipality has 33,722 inhabitants.

In Romanian, the town is known as Cuvin, in Hungarian as Kevevára or (until 1899) Temeskubin, and in German as Kubin or Temeschkubin.  In the past, the town was also known as Donji Kovin ("lower Kovin") in contrast to the town with same name in Hungary that was known in Serbian as Gornji Kovin ("upper Kovin") and in Hungarian as Ráckeve ("the Serb Kovin").

History 
The Dacian tribe of Albocenses dwelled in this area in the second century AD. There are remains of the ancient Roman fortress called Contra Margum, opposite to the Margum, a fortress on the other side of the Danube. In the ninth and tenth centuries, this area was populated by Slavs and Romanians and Voivode Glad ruled over the region. Glad was defeated by the Hungarians, and the area was included into the medieval Kingdom of Hungary. In the 11th century, one of the descendants of Glad, Ahtum, ruled over the region but he, too, was defeated by the Hungarians.

The earliest mention of the settlement was in 1071 as Keuee. Kovin is mentioned in the 12th century as a seat of the county, which included most of the western Banat. Since the 14th century, the city has had a large Serb population that escaped there from Serbia under threat by the Ottomans. The Serbian despot Lazar Branković took control over the city in 1457, but in the next year it came again under control of the Kingdom of Hungary.

In the 16th century, the city was included in the Ottoman Empire and became a part of the Ottoman Province of Temeşvar. During the Ottoman rule (16th-17th century), Kovin was mostly populated by ethnic Serbs. In 1716, it became part of the Habsburg monarchy and belonged to the Habsburg Banat of Temeswar until 1751 when it became part of the Habsburg Military Frontier (Banat Krajina).

In 1848/1849, Kovin was part of the Serbian Voivodship, but in 1849 it was again placed under administration of the Military Frontier. With the abolishment of the Military Frontier in 1873, Kovin was incorporated into Temes county within the Kingdom of Hungary. According to the 1910 census, Kovin District had a population of 35,482, of whom 21,795 spoke Serbian, 6,587 German, 5,705 Romanian, and 5,355 Hungarian.

This town had a significant role in the outbreak of World War I.  In July 1914, a purported military skirmish here was a proximate cause of the declaration of war against Serbia by Franz Joseph I of Austria, but the report of such skirmish was apparently false, or greatly exaggerated.

In 1918, Kovin became part of the Kingdom of Serbs, Croats and Slovenes (renamed to Yugoslavia in 1929). Between 1918 and 1922, it was part of Banat county; between 1922 and 1929 part of the Podunavska oblast; and between 1929 and 1941 part of the Danube Banovina. Between 1941 and 1944, Kovin was under Axis occupation and was part of the autonomous Banat region within German-occupied Serbia. The town was heavily bombed by the Allies in 1944. In 1945, it became part of the Socialist Autonomous Province of Vojvodina within the Socialist Republic of Serbia and the Socialist Federal Republic of Yugoslavia. In 1992, Kovin became part of the Federal Republic of Yugoslavia, which was in 2003 transformed into the state union of Serbia and Montenegro. Since 2006, the town is part of an independent Serbia.

Inhabited places 
Kovin municipality includes the town of Kovin and the following villages:
 Bavanište
 Gaj
Deliblato
Dubovac
Malo Bavanište
Mramorak
Pločica
Skorenovac
Šumarak

There is also this unofficial settlement in municipality:
 Čardak

Demographics

According to the 2011 census, the total population of the municipality of Kovin was 33,722 inhabitants.

Ethnic groups

Municipality

Settlements with a Serb ethnic majority are: Kovin, Bavanište, Gaj, Deliblato, Dubovac, Malo Bavanište, Mramorak, and Pločica. Skorenovac has a Hungarian ethnic majority. Šumarak is an ethnically mixed settlement with a relative Hungarian majority.

Town

Economy
The following table gives a preview of total number of registered people employed in legal entities per their core activity (as of 2018):

Twin cities 
 Ráckeve, Hungary

See also
List of places in Serbia
Municipalities of Serbia
South Banat District

References 

Jovan Erdeljanović, Srbi u Banatu, Novi Sad, 1992.
Slobodan Ćurčić, Broj stanovnika Vojvodine, Novi Sad, 1996.

External links 

 Municipality of Kovin
 Radio BUS - News from Kovin
 Kovin Ekspres - online news and newspaper from Kovin
 NETcom - Information technologies - services and data recovery

 
Populated places in Serbian Banat
Populated places in South Banat District
Municipalities and cities of Vojvodina
Towns in Serbia